Helen Wright (born Helen Boyd) was an American character actress who appeared on the stage and screen during Hollywood's silent era. She spent most of her career under contract at Universal.

Selected filmography 
The Mistress of Shenstone (1921)
That Something (1920)
The Speed Maniac (1919)
The Brass Bullet (1918)
Her One Mistake (1918)
The Lash of Power (1917)
Sirens of the Sea (1917)
Triumph (1917)
 The Lash of Power (1917)
The Car of Chance (1917)
A Doll's House (1917)
The Field of Honor (1917)
Polly Redhead (1917)
A Stranger from Somewhere (1916)
The Morals of Hilda (1916)
Is Any Girl Safe? (1916)
Heartaches (1916)
The Scarlet Sin (1915)
Heritage (1915)
Under the Crescent (1915)
The Black Box (1915)
Damon and Pythias (1914)

References 

American film actresses
Actresses from Saint Paul, Minnesota
1868 births
1928 deaths